The Big Jubilee Read is a 2022 campaign to promote reading for pleasure and to celebrate the Platinum Jubilee of Elizabeth II. A list of 70 books by Commonwealth authors, 10 from each decade of Elizabeth II's reign, was selected by a panel of experts and announced by the BBC and The Reading Agency on 18 April 2022.

Selection process
An initial long-list was compiled from readers' suggestions, and a panel of librarians, booksellers and "literature specialists" made the choice of 70 titles, aiming "to engage all readers in the discovery and celebration of great books". The project received funding from the Arts Council and is supported by Libraries Connected and the Booksellers Association.

The organisers hope that the project will "celebrate the joy of reading and the power that it has to connect people across the country and among nations". Nineteen of the books are winners of the Booker Prize. Most of the books are novels written in English, but there are also poetry collections such as Death of a Naturalist and short story collections including The Boat, while One Moonlit Night was published in Welsh as Un Nos Ola Leuad, Le Procès-Verbal and Our Lady of the Nile were originally in French, and Shuggie Bain is in English but with dialogue in Scots.

The list
The list was published by the BBC on 18 April 2022.

Commonwealth nations by number of books 
Where an author is given two countries of origin in the above list, 0.5 is given to each country.

Omissions and other issues
Commentators discussed several omission of potential titles: J. R. R. Tolkien's The Lord of the Rings (ranked number 1 in the 2003 The Big Read); J. K. Rowling's Harry Potter books; Terry Pratchett's Discworld series; Philip Pullman's His Dark Materials trilogy, Doris Lessing's The Golden Notebook; and the work of Dick Francis, reportedly one of the Queen's favourite authors. The inclusion of Northern Irish writer Seamus Heaney was explained by the fact that when he wrote Death of a Naturalist he was living in the UK and published by an English publisher; Heaney identified as an Irish nationalist and had previously objected to his inclusion in The Penguin Book of Contemporary British Poetry.

In The Telegraph, Allison Pearson called it a You'll take your medicine and like it' kind of list compiled by people who were scared stiff of not being diverse enough." Similarly, in The Article, David Herman complained: "If you like Hornblower or James Bond, witches and hobbits, great children's literature, popular poetry or drama, The Big Jubilee Read doesn't care. What it does care about is post-colonial, ideally non-white, literature."

References

External links
 Lists of titles, by decade, with cover image for each title and a paragraph about the decade in Commonwealth literature; links to a book description for every title

Platinum Jubilee of Elizabeth II
BBC
Top book lists
Book promotion
Literacy